This is a list of Virginia Cavaliers football seasons. The Cavaliers are part of the National Collegiate Athletic Association (NCAA) Division I Football Bowl Subdivision (FBS). Since their inception in 1888, the Cavaliers have played in over 1,200 games through over a century of play along with 18 bowl games, with only an interruption from 1917 to 1918 due to World War I.

In the early years, the team played as an independent Southern team, with the result being that they were declared champions of the South on an independent level numerous times from 1889 to 1908. They played in the South Atlantic Intercollegiate Athletic Association from 1911 to 1921.

From 1921 to 1937, they played in the Southern Conference as a charter member, alongside universities such as Virginia Tech and North Carolina State. From 1937 to 1953, they played as an independent before joining the Atlantic Coast Conference in 1954.

The Cavaliers did not have much success in their early years in the ACC, as they took 12 years just to finish above 4th in the conference. Success eluded them until the hiring of George Welsh in 1982. In his third season, the team finished 2nd in the conference while winning seven games, losing twice and tying twice before being invited to the Peach Bowl, which they won 27–24 over Purdue. In 1989, they won the conference, their first conference title in over half a century, while winning 10 games for the first time in school history. The Cavaliers went to 12 bowl games during Welsh's 18 years as coach, with their highest finish in the polls being 15th in 1994. The Cavaliers won the ACC title in 1995 along with Florida State, which remains their last conference title. After Welsh retired in 2000, Al Groh was hired to become coach. In nine seasons, he led them to five bowl appearances, although he did not lead them to an ACC title prior to being fired in 2009. Mike London led the team for six seasons from 2010 to 2015, with more losing seasons (five) than bowl appearances (one). Bronco Mendenhall was hired as coach in 2016. He led them to an appearance in the Military Bowl in 2017, their first bowl appearance since 2011.

Seasons

References

Virginia Cavaliers
Virginia Cavaliers football seasons